Wao or WAO may refer to :

 Places
 Wao, Lanao del Sur, a municipality in the Philippines
 Wao State (Vav, Wai, Way), a former princely state in Banas Katha, Gujarat, India

 Other
 Wao language, a native language of the Amazon rainforest
 West Australian Opera
 Wet air oxidation, a waste water treatment technology
 Women's Aid Organisation, a Malaysian non-governmental organization
 World Allergy Organization
 World Autism Organisation
 WAO!!, an album by Japanese band OreSkaBand
 Oscar Wao, protagonist of The Brief Wondrous Life of Oscar Wao

See also 
 Wow (disambiguation)